The Loss of Sexual Innocence is a 1999 film written and directed by Mike Figgis. It tells the story of the sexual development of a filmmaker through three stages of his life, in a non-linear and disjointed manner. The film stars British actress Saffron Burrows, whom Figgis dated for several years.

Plot
The story at the center of the movie is the tumultuous life of Nic (Julian Sands), a British director beginning a new film project in Tunisia.

Cast
 Julian Sands as Adult Nic
 Jonathan Rhys Meyers as Nic, aged 16
 Saffron Burrows as English/Italian Twin
 Stefano Dionisi as Luca
 Kelly Macdonald as Susan
 Gina McKee as Susan's Mother
 Bernard Hill as Susan's Father
 Rossy de Palma as Blind Woman
 Justin Chadwick as Flash Man
 Femi Ogunbanjo as Adam
 Hanne Klintoe as Eve

Production
The Loss of Sexual Innocence was based on a script called “Short Stories,” which Figgis had written in 1982. His original concept was to have been a multimedia show featuring film, live performance and music. The success of Leaving Las Vegas allowed him to finance the making of the nearly two-decades-old cinematic project.

Reception
Stephen Holden of The New York Times wrote, "Those with no patience for avant-garde films will want to avoid The Loss of Sexual Innocence...Everyone else will find moments of surpassing beauty in this courageous, deeply flawed film." He was effusive in his praise for Figgis creating the film's atmosphere "through its mixture of music, beautiful outdoor cinematography and somber, silent acting." What he considered flaws were the Adam and Eve storyline and two scenes which he considered irrelevant involving an airport encounter between identical twins separated at birth and the humiliation of an obese 12-year-old Nic by a gym teacher.

Like Holden, Roger Ebert delineated what type of movie it is by explaining it as "an 'art film,' which means it tries to do something more advanced than most commercial films (which tell stories simple enough for children, in images shocking enough for adults)." He rated it  stars out of 4, adding that it "plays like a musical composition, with themes drifting in and out, and dialogue used more for tone than speech....Not all of it works, but you play along, because it's rare to find a film this ambitious."

Taking a more playful approach in his review, Jeff Millar of the Houston Chronicle came to a similar conclusion as Holden and Ebert and explained, "If you are an adventurous filmgoer, interested in technique, certainly go. If you like stories with 'stories,' which go from Point A to Point B with conflicts along the way, this film may be a little too atonal for you."

Emanuel Levy of Variety was critical of the movie as commentary on Nic’s loss of innocence and the entire state of civilization, stating that "it’s in this intent that the film fails most conspicuously, giving Figgis’ skeptics the strongest ammunition to dismiss his work as pretentious and overreaching." Desson Howe of The Washington Post was more scathing in his analysis and declared, "For me, at least, The Loss of Sexual Innocence is the highly cinematic equivalent of a smoke-and-mirrors job."

Soundtrack

Soundtrack album listing

References

External links 
 
 

1999 films
Films directed by Mike Figgis
American independent films
1999 drama films
Films set in 1953
Films set in Kenya
Films set in Cumbria
British independent films
American drama films
British drama films
Summit Entertainment films
1999 independent films
Sony Pictures Classics films
1990s English-language films
1990s American films
1990s British films